Bradley Bozeman (born November 24, 1994) is an American football center for the Carolina Panthers of the National Football League (NFL). He played college football at Alabama and was drafted by the Baltimore Ravens in the sixth round of the 2018 NFL Draft.

College career
Bozeman received offers from multiple top football programs including the Alabama Crimson Tide, Auburn, Clemson and Tennessee. He committed to the Alabama Crimson Tide in 2013. He was redshirted in 2013. The following year, Bozeman had two starts (Arkansas and Texas A&M) and played in nine games. In 2015, Bozeman played in all 15 games as a reserve guard and center.

Bozeman earned a starting spot at center in 2016. He played in all 15 games and blocked for 11 100-yard rushing games. Bozeman was voted team captain by his teammates for the 2017 season. In his senior year, as a starting center, he helped Alabama win the 2018 College Football Playoff National Championship.

Professional career

Baltimore Ravens
Bozeman was drafted by the Baltimore Ravens in the sixth round (215th overall) of the 2018 NFL Draft. He played in 14 games as a rookie, starting one game, against the New Orleans Saints, at left guard. In his second season, Bozeman was named starting left guard, and started every game of the 2019 and 2020 seasons. In 2021 he made the shift to being the starting center.

Carolina Panthers
On March 18, 2022, Bozeman signed a one-year contract with the Carolina Panthers.

On March 13, 2023, Bozeman signed a three-year, $18 million contract extension with the Panthers.

Personal life
Bozeman proposed to Alabama basketball player Nikki Hegstetter in 2018, after the College Football Playoff championship game against Georgia. They married on March 23, 2019.

During the 2019 NFL season, Bozeman and his wife Nikki lived full-time in an RV they had bought for offseason travel, but soon decided to live full-time in it. In a 2020 ESPN story, Bozeman estimated that the move saved them about $1,800 per month in rent. After the season, they traveled the U.S. in a smaller donated RV, combining anti-bullying presentations to student groups with sightseeing side trips until their venture was cut short due to COVID-19 pandemic. The couple initially planned to live in their larger RV for at least two more years, but found a house they felt they could not pass up, and planned to move into it upon their return from their cross-country trip.

In 2018, Bozeman and Nikki founded the Bradley & Nikki Bozeman Foundation, which focuses on at-risk children and their families to educate them on the dangers of childhood bullying. In 2020, the foundation held a number of food drives in partnership with Mount Pleasant Church and Ministries.

References

External links
Baltimore Ravens bio
Alabama Crimson Tide bio

1994 births
Living people
Alabama Crimson Tide football players
American football centers
American football offensive guards
Baltimore Ravens players
Carolina Panthers players
People from Roanoke, Alabama
Players of American football from Alabama